The Esparragalejo Dam was a Roman multiple arch buttress dam at Esparragalejo, Badajoz province, Extremadura, Spain. Dating to the 1st century AD, it is the earliest known multiple arch dam.

See also 
 List of Roman dams and reservoirs
 Roman architecture
 Roman engineering

Notes

References 
 
 
 
 

Roman dams in Spain
Arch dams
Buttress dams in Spain
Province of Badajoz
Buildings and structures in Extremadura